Bust of Bernardo O'Higgins may refer to:

 Bust of Bernardo O'Higgins (Houston)
 Bust of Bernardo O'Higgins (Washington, D.C.)